Disability anthropology is a cross-section of anthropological studies which studies disability studies through the domain of culture. The main subdisciplines active in disability anthropology studies include the medical anthropology and cultural anthropology fields.

The field of disability anthropology focuses on understanding the sociocultural problems of disability and uses research to develop and assess approaches to solving problems or helping to bring about change in the disabled community. The topic of disability within anthropology persuades researchers to use a cultural lens and ethnological approach to identify unfamiliarity and "otherness" among cultures.

History 
The contribution of anthropology to disability studies is still relatively new.

Some important figures in the discourse of anthropological involvement in disability include Devva Kasnitz and Russell Shuttleworth.

See also 
 Applied anthropology
 Medical anthropology
 Cultural anthropology

References

Medical anthropology
Cultural anthropology
Disability studies